Kiki and Kitty is an Australian comedy series released through ABC Television's streaming service, iview, in 2017 and then screened on ABC Comedy.

Synopsis
The series follows the adventures of Kiki, the good black girl in a bad white world, who stumbles across her vagina in the personification of Kitty, a big, black woman who makes her realise there is a lot more to life than she thought.

Production
The series is created and written by Nakkiah Lui, produced by Liz Watts and Sylvia Warmer for Porchlight Films, and directed by Catriona McKenzie.

Cast
 Nakkiah Lui as Kiki
 Elaine Crombie as Kitty
 Christine Anu as Maria, Kiki's mum 
 Tessa Rose as Nan
 Charlie Garber as Jack
 Harriet Dyer as Cherise
 Ryan Johnson as Brandon
 Rob Carlton as Bryce
 Lisa Flanagan as Nan's Kitty 
 Dave Eastgate as Jack Junior
 Steve Rodgers as Merryweather

Episodes
Episode information retrieved from Australian Television Archive.

References

External links
  
 

Australian comedy television series
2017 Australian television series debuts
Australian Broadcasting Corporation original programming